Felipe Stievano Micheletti (born May 24, 1990) is a Brazilian professional kickboxer who fights in the light-heavyweight division of GLORY. Before signing with the promotion, he also competed in Kunlun Fight and SUPERKOMBAT.

He is ranked as the sixth best light heavyweight in the world by Combat Press as of September 2022, and fourth best by Beyond Kick as of October 2022. He's been continually ranked in the Combat Press Light Heavyweight top ten since November 2018.

Kickboxing career

Amateur career
Micheletti participated in 37 amateur fights with 30 wins, including 15 wins by knockout. In 2009, he became Brazilian champion 
through the Brazilian Confederation of Kickboxing in the K-1 style, super-heavy category. He has also been a Septa Brazilian champion and the World Association of Kickboxing Organizations (WAKO) Pan American kickboxing champion, World Champion, and two-time Vice-World Champion.

SUPERKOMBAT
Micheletti debuted in November 2009 as a professional against Edson Lima at KO Fight in Apucarana, and soon afterwards was invited to fight Cleber Rodrigues. 

After a mixed start to his professional career, including a loss to Alex Pereira, Micheletti took part in the WGP Supekombat Heavyweight Tournament. In the semifinals, he defeated Rogélio Ortiz by a second round liver kick KO. In the tournament finals he faced Edson Lima, whom he defeated by a split decision.

WGP Kickboxing
Micheletti fought Saulo Cavalari for the WGP Brazilian Light Heavyweight title at WGP 14 on July 27, 2013. Cavalari won the fight by a fifth-round technical knockout.

On December 21, 2013, Micheletti fought Francisco Lefevbre during the WGP Final Tour event. He beat Lefevbre in the first round, by knockout. Micheletti was booked to face the WKN and WAKO champion Vladimir Mineev at WGP Kickboxing: Russia X Brasil on May 17, 2014, and lost a unanimous decision.

Micheletti fought Wallyson Maguila for the Brasilian Professional Kickboxing Light Heavyweight title at WGP 22 on September 27, 2014. Micheletti won the fight by technical knockout. Michelleti won a unanimous decision against Toni Milanovic at WGP 24 on December 20, 2014. Micheletti faced Guto Inocente for the WGP light heavyweight (-84 kg) championship. Inocente won the fight by unanimous decision.

Micheletti faced Carlos Meza for the WGP Light Heavyweight title on July 2, 2016. He won the fight by unanimous decision. In his next fight, Micheletti fought for the WKN K-1 Super Cruiserweight title, facing Rogélio Ortiz at IVC International Vale Tudo championship on August 20, 2016. He knocked Ortiz out in the first round.

Kunlun Fight
Micheletti made his Kunlun Fight debut at Kunlun Fight 56 on January 2, 2017, against Andrey Gerasimchuk. Gerasimchuk won the bout by unanimous decision. 

Micheletti successfully defended the WGP Heavyweight title with a unanimous decision win over Haime Morais at WGP 37 on May 20, 2017.

He afterwards participated in the Kunlun Fight Heavyweight tournament. In the quarterfinals, Micheletti beat Liu Junchao by technical knockout, but lost to Roman Kryklia by unanimous decision in the semifinals.

A month after his loss to Kryklia, Micheletti facedIgor Darmeshkin, for the vacant WAKO Pro World Low Kick Light Heavyweight title, at Battle of Champions 10 on March 16, 2018. He won the fight by unanimous decision.

Micheletti defended his WGP heavyweight title for the second time with a decision win over Ivan Galaz at WGP 45 on May 5, 2018.

Glory
Felipe Micheletti made his Glory debut at Glory 60: Lyon on October 20, 2018, when he was scheduled to fight Zinedine Hameur-Lain. He won the fight by technical knockout, after Hameur-Lain was forced to retire at the end of the first round due to injury.

He was next booked to fight Luis Tavares at Glory 66: Paris on June 22, 2019, as a short notice replacement for Stephane Susperregui. He won the fight by a split decision.

Micheletti faced Stéphane Susperregui at Glory 69: Düsseldorf on October 12, 2019. Despite being knocked down early in the fight, Susperregui managed to take the fight into an extra round, after which he won a decision.

Micheletti was scheduled to fight a rematch with Luis Tavares at Glory 78: Arnhem, on a month's notice, as a replacement for Sergej Maslobojev. He lost the fight by unanimous decision.

Micheletti faced the #5 ranked Glory light heavyweight contender Donegi Abena at Glory: Collision 4 on October 8, 2022.

Micheletti faced Nordine Mahieddine at Glory 84 on March 11, 2023. He won the fight by unanimous decision, after twice knocking Mahieddine down.

Championships and accomplishments 
Boxing
 Champion CopaLisoboxe – gold
 Champion Brasil Ceintures – gold
 Champion Kid Jofre – gold
 Vice-Champion Forja dos Campeões – silver

Kickboxing
2018 WAKO Pro World Low Kick Championship -94.2 kg
2016 WKN World Super Cruiserweight (under 92.50 kg) K-1 Championship
2013 SUPERKOMBAT New Heroes 2 Heavyweight Tournament Championship

Mixed martial arts record

|-
|Win
|align=center|1-0
|Manoel Vitor Santos
|KO (Punch to the body)
|Fight Pro Championship 2
|
|align=center|1
|align=center|2:20
|São Paulo, Brazil
|

Kickboxing record

|-  style="background:#cfc;"
| 2023-03-11 || Win ||align=left| Nordine Mahieddine || Glory 84 || Rotterdam, Netherlands || Decision (Unanimous) || 3 || 3:00
|-

|-  bgcolor= "#fbb"
| 2022-10-08 || Loss ||align=left| Donegi Abena || Glory: Collision 4 || Arnhem, Netherlands || Decision (Unanimous) ||3  ||3:00 
|-
|- style="background:#fbb;"
| 2021-09-04 || Loss ||align=left| Luis Tavares || Glory 78: Arnhem || Arnhem, Netherlands || Decision (Unanimous) || 3 || 3:00 
|-
! style=background:white colspan=9 |
|-
|- style="background:#fbb;"
| 2019-10-12 || Loss ||align=left| Stéphane Susperregui || Glory 69: Düsseldorf || Düsseldorf, Germany || Ext.R Decision (Unanimous) || 4 || 3:00
|-  style="background:#cfc;"
| 2019-06-22 || Win ||align=left| Luis Tavares || Glory 66: Paris || Paris, France || Decision (Split) || 3 || 3:00
|- style="background:#cfc;"
| 2018-10-20 || Win ||align=left| Zinedine Hameur-Lain || Glory 60: Lyon || Lyon, France || TKO (Retirement) ||1 || 3:00
|-  bgcolor= "#CCFFCC"
| 2018-05-05 || Win ||align=left| Ivan Galaz || WGP 45 || São Paulo, Brazil || Decision (Unanimous) || 5 || 3:00
|-
! style="background:white" colspan=9 |
|-
|- style="background:#cfc;"
| 2018-03-16 || Win || align=left| Igor Darmeshkin || Battle of Champions 10 || Moscow, Russia || Decision || 5 || 3:00
|-
! style="background:white" colspan=9 |
|-
|- style="background:#fbb;"
| 2018-02-04 || Loss ||align=left| Roman Kryklia ||Kunlun Fight 69 Heavyweight Tournament, Semi Finals || China || Decision (Unanimous) || 3 ||
|- 
|-  bgcolor= "#CCFFCC"
| 2017-12-17|| Win ||align=left| Liu Junchao || Kunlun Fight 68 Heavyweight Tournament, Quarter Finals || China || TKO  || ||
|-  bgcolor= "#CCFFCC"
| 2017-05-20 || Win ||align=left| Haime Morais || WGP 37 || Sorocaba, São Paulo || Decision (unanimous) || 5 || 3:00
|-
! style="background:white" colspan=9 |
|-
|- style="background:#cfc;"
|-  bgcolor= "#FFBBBB"
| 2017-01-02 || Loss ||align=left| Andrey Gerasimchuk || Kunlun Fight 56 || Sanya, Hainan, China || Decision (unanimous) ||3 ||3:00
|-
|-  bgcolor= "#CCFFCC"
| 2016-08-20 || Win ||align=left| Rogélio Ortiz || IVC International Vale Tudo championship || Brazil ||  ||1 ||1:45
|-
! style=background:white colspan=9 |
|- 
|-  bgcolor= "#CCFFCC"
| 2016-07-02 || Win ||align=left| Carlos Meza || WGP Kickboxing || Brazil || Decision ||5 ||3:00
|-
! style=background:white colspan=9 |
|- 
|-  bgcolor= "#CCFFCC"
| 2016-05-07 || Win ||align=left| Haime Morais || WGP Kickboxing 3.0 – Special Edition || Brazil || Decision (unanimous) ||3 ||3:00
|-
|-  bgcolor= "#FFBBBB"
| 2015-09-05 || Loss ||align=left| Guto Inocente || WGP Kickboxing 26 || Guarapuava, Brazil || Decision (unanimous) || 5 || 3:00 
|-
! style=background:white colspan=9 |
|-
|-  bgcolor= "#CCFFCC"
| 2015-06-20 || Win ||align=left| Fábio Alberto Cordovil || Jungle Fight 78 || Brazil || Decision (unanimous) ||5 ||3:00
|-
! style=background:white colspan=9 |
|- 
|-  bgcolor= "#CCFFCC"
| 2014-12-20 || Win ||align=left| Toni Milanovic || WGP 24 || São Paulo, Brazil || Decision (unanimous) ||3 ||3:00
|-
|-  bgcolor="CCFFCC"
| 2014-09-27 || Win ||align=left| Wallyson Maguila || WGP 22 || Brazil ||  ||  ||
|-
! style=background:white colspan=9 |
|- 
|-  bgcolor="#FFBBBB"
| 2014-05-17 || Loss ||align=left| Vladimir Mineev || WGP Kickboxing: Russia X Brasil || São Paulo, Brazil || Decision (unanimous) || 3 || 3:00
|-
|-  bgcolor="CCFFCC"
| 2013-12-21 || Win ||align=left| Francisco Lefevbre || WGP Final Tour || Brazil || KO || 1 ||
|-
|-  bgcolor="#FFBBBB"
| 2013-07-27 || Loss ||align=left| Saulo Cavalari  || WGP 14 || São Paulo, Brazil || TKO || 5 || 
|-
! style=background:white colspan=9 |
|- 
|-  bgcolor="CCFFCC"
| 2013-03-23 || Win ||align=left| Edson Lima || SUPERKOMBAT New Heroes 2 || São Caetano, Brazil || Decision (split) || 3 || 3:00
|-
! style=background:white colspan=9 |
|- 
|-  bgcolor="CCFFCC"
| 2013-03-23 || Win ||align=left| Rogélio Ortiz || SUPERKOMBAT New Heroes 2 || São Caetano, Brazil|| KO (liver kick) || 2 ||
|-
|-  bgcolor="#FFBBBB"
| 2012-09-16 || Loss ||align=left| Alex Pereira || WGP Kickboxing 9 || São Paulo, Brazil || Decision (unanimous) || 3  ||
|-
|-  bgcolor= "#CCFFCC"
| 2012-06-02 || Win ||align=left| Cleber Rodrigues || WGP Kickboxing 8 || Brazil || Decision ||3 ||3:00
|-
|-  bgcolor="#FFBBBB"
| 2011-11-12 || Loss ||align=left| Edson Lima || K.O Fight – Apucarana || Brazil || Decision (unanimous) || 3  || 3:00
|-
|-
| colspan=9 | Legend:

See also
List of male kickboxers

References 

1990 births
Living people
Brazilian male kickboxers
Sportspeople from São Paulo
Kunlun Fight kickboxers
SUPERKOMBAT kickboxers